Charagua is a small town in the southern part of Bolivia. It is the principal village of the Cordillera province.  Most inhabitants speak Guaraní. The city was briefly occupied by the Paraguayan Army in April 1935, during the last stages of the Chaco War. 
Charagua consists of two separate towns, the old town and a settlement along the railway track, 3.2 km (2 miles) east.

The organization CIPCA (Centro de Investigacion y de Promocion del Camesinado) has been active in Charagua already for more than three decades. The house of the Guarani (Arakwarenda) is located north of the town. There is an experimental farm adjacent to Arakwarenda.

Che Guevara during his dwellings in the Cordillera never reached Charagua. He stopped short at El Espino, a two-hour drive to the north.

Gallery 

Populated places in Santa Cruz Department (Bolivia)